IHC may refer to:

Medicine
 Immunohistochemistry
 Intrahepatic cholestasis

Science and technology
  Indirectly Heated Cathode, a type of hot cathode used in vacuum electronics tubes 
 Intelligent Home Control, home automation and control system
 FAT IHC OEM label, a Windows 9x signature in OEM labels of FAT volumes

Transport
 Inhaca Airport, Mozambique (by IATA code)

Organisations
 IHC New Zealand, a national organisation for the support of intellectually disabled persons
 Immigration Holding Centres, Canadian immigration detention facilities
 India Habitat Centre
 Interagency Hotshot Crew, a Type 1 handcrew of wildland firefighters
 Interchurch Holiness Convention, an ecumenical organization of Wesleyan-Arminian denominations
 Intermountain Healthcare, a healthcare network in Utah, United States
 International Harvester Corporation
 International Humanitarian City
 International Hat Company
 Islamabad High Court, a court in Islamabad, Pakistan

Other
 IHC, a Christogram
 Institute for Human Continuity, a viral marketing campaign for the film 2012